Gregory Marmoiton is a French professional rugby union player. He plays at prop for Castres in the Top 14.

References

External links
Ligue Nationale De Rugby Profile
European Professional Club Rugby Profile

1990 births
Living people
French rugby union players
Castres Olympique players
Tarbes Pyrénées Rugby players
Rugby union props